Miss Malaysia World 1991, the 25th edition of the Miss World Malaysia pageant was held at the Concorde Hotel in Kuala Lumpur. Miss Malaysia World 1989, Vivian Chen crowned her successor, Samantha Schubert from Kuala Lumpur at the end of the event. Schubert then represented Malaysia at Miss World 1991.

Overall, the organizers however seemed to have failed in the aspect of controlling the entry of the guests and the confusion that arose caused by some of the guests to mistake their seats. The reporters were not given enough seats while the inaccurate selection of songs for the state costume segment slightly marred the contest.

Present were Malaysian politician Minister of Culture, Arts and Tourism Dato Sabbaruddin Chik, Director of The Star Steven Tan, National Director of Miss Malaysia World Tan Sri V. Jeyaratnam as well as Miss Malaysia Universe 1970 Josephine Lena Wong.

Results

Contestants

References 

Miss World
1991
1991 in Malaysia
1991 beauty pageants